The Cyprus men's national under-20 basketball team is a national basketball team of Cyprus, administered by the Cyprus Basketball Federation. It represents the country in men's international under-20 basketball competitions.

FIBA U20 European Championship participations

See also
Cyprus men's national basketball team
Cyprus men's national under-18 basketball team

References

External links
Archived records of Cyprus team participations

Basketball in Cyprus
Basketball
Men's national under-20 basketball teams